The Acanthodrilidae are an ancient and widely distributed family of earthworms which has native representatives in Australia, New Zealand, South Africa, South America, and North America.  No native species are known from India (cf. Octochaetidae) nor Asia. The family possibly shows a pre-Pangaean distribution.

Membership requires an 'acanthodriline' arrangement of male pores and holoic nephridia.

Genera

 Acanthodrilus Perrier, 1872
 Afrogaster Csuzdi, 2010
 Agastrodrilus Omodeo & Vaillaud, 1967
 Bahlia Gates, 1945
 Balanteodrilus Pickford, 1938
 Barogaster Gates, 1940
 Benhamia Michaelsen, 1889
 Benhamiona Csuzdi & Zicsi, 1994
 Borgesia James, 1991
 Calebiella Gates, 1945
 Celeriella Gates, 1958
 Chacdrilus Fragoso & Rojas, 2009
 Chaetocotoides Julka, 1988
 Chilota Michaelsen, 1899
 Cubadrilus Rodriguez & Fragoso, 2002
 Dashiella Julka, 1988
 Decachaetus Lee, 1959
 Deinodrilus Beddard, 1888
 Dichogaster Beddard, 1888
 Dinodriloides Benham, 1904
 Diplocardia Garman, 1888
 Diplotrema Spencer, 1900
 Drilocheira Fender and McKey-Fender, 1990
 Dudichiodrilus Csuzdi, 1995
 Eodriloides Zicsi, 1998
 Eodrilus Michaelsen, 1907
 Eudichogaster Michaelsen, 1902
 Eudinodriloides Lee, 1959
 Eutrigaster Cognetti, 1904
 Eutyphoeus Michaelsen, 1900
 Exxus Gates, 1959
 Guineoscolex Csuzdi & Zicsi, 1994
 Herbettodrilus Julka, Blanchart & Chapuis-Lardy, 2004
 Hoplochaetella Michaelsen, 1900
 Hoplochaetina Michaelsen, 1926
 Kanchuria Julka, 1988
 Karmiella Julka, 1983
 Kaxdrilus Fragoso & Rojas, 1994
 Kayarmacia Jamieson, 1997
 Konkadrilus Julka, 1988
 Kotegeharia Julka, 1988
 Larsonidrilus James, 1993
 Lavellodrilus Fragoso, 1988
 Lennogaster Gates, 1939
 Leucodrilus Lee, 1952
 Loksaia Csuzdi, 1996
 Mallehulla Julka, 1982
 Maoridrilus Michaelsen, 1899
 Mayadrilus Fragoso & Rojas, 1994
 Microscolex Rosa, 1887
 Millsonia Beddard, 1894
 Monothecodrilus Csuzdi & Zicsi, 1994
 Nellogaster Gates, 1938
 Neochaeta Lee, 1959
 Neodiplotrema Dyne, 1997
 Neodrilus Beddard, 1887
 Neogaster Cernosvitov, 1934
 Neotrigaster James, 1991
 Notiodrilus Michaelsen, 1899
 Octochaetoides Michaelsen, 1926
 Octochaetona Gates, 1962
 Octochaetus Beddard, 1893
 Octonochaeta Julka, 1988
 Omodeona Sims, 1967
 Omodeoscolex Csuzdi, 1993
 Parachilota Pickford, 1937
 Pellogaster Gates, 1939
 Perieodrilus Michaelsen, 1910
 Pickfordia Omodeo, 1958
 Pickfordiella Csuzdi, 2010
 Plagiochaeta Benham, 1892
 Priodochaeta Gates, 1940
 Priodoscolex Gates, 1940
 Protozapotecia James, 1993
 Ramiella Stephenson, 1921
 Ramiellona Michaelsen, 1935
 Reginaldia Csuzdi, 2006
 Rhododrilus Beddard, 1889
 Rillogaster Gates, 1939
 Scolioscolides Gates, 1937
 Senapatiella Julka, Blanchart & Chapuis-Lardy, 2004
 Shimodrilus Julka, Blanchart & Chapuis-Lardy, 2004
 Sylvodrilus Lee, 1959
 Travoscolides Gates, 1940
 Trigaster Benham, 1886
 Udeina Michaelsen, 1910
 Wahoscolex Julka, 1988
 Wegeneriella Michaelsen, 1933
 Wegeneriona Cernosvitov, 1939
 Yagansia Michaelsen, 1899
 Zapatadrilus James, 1991
 Zapotecia Eisen, 1900

Sources 
 Blakemore, R.J. (2005). Whither Octochaetidae? – its family status reviewed.   In: Advances in Earthworm Taxonomy II. Eds. A.A. & V.V. Pop. Proceedings IOTM2, Cluj University Press. Romania. pp. 63–84. https://web.archive.org/web/20071210202216/http://www.oligochaeta.org/ITOM2/IOTM2.htm; https://web.archive.org/web/20110722081605/http://bio-eco.eis.ynu.ac.jp/eng/database/earthworm/Octochaetidae5.doc .
 Blakemore, R.J. (2006). Revised Key to Earthworm Families (Ch. 9). In: A Series of Searchable Texts on Earthworm Biodiversity, Ecology and Systematics from Various Regions of the World – 3rd Edition (2008).  Ed.: R.J. Blakemore. VermEcology, Yokohama, Japan. ICZN validated CD-ROM Publication. Website: http://www.annelida.net/earthworm/.
 Michaelsen, W. (1900). Das Tierreich 10: Vermes, Oligochaeta. Friedländer & Sohn, Berlin.  Pp. xxix+575, figs. 1-13. Online here: https://archive.org/details/oligochaeta10mich.
 Stephenson, J. (1930). The Oligochaeta. Clarendon Press, Oxford. Pp. 978.
Blakemore, R.J. (2013). The major megadrile families of the World reviewed again on their taxonomic types (Annelida: Oligochaeta: Megadrilacea). Opuscula Zoologica Budapest: 44(2): 107–127. .

Haplotaxida